The New Zealand Memorial is an obelisk in Greenwich that commemorates 21 British officers and men of the Royal Navy who died in the New Zealand War of 1863–64.  The memorial is located near the River Thames, east of the Cutty Sark, close to the Royal Naval College, Greenwich.  It became a Grade II listed building in 1973.

The obelisk is made from pink-grey Cornish granite.  It stands on a square plinth that rests on three wide steps.  The plinth is decorated with mouldings resembling chains and ropes, and bears inscriptions on each side.  It was constructed c. 1872 and became Grade 2 listed in June 1973.

The 21 dead commemorated by the memorial include Captain John Fane Charles Hamilton (who commanded HMS Esk and after whom the city of Hamilton is named), Commander Edward Hay (who commanded HMS Harrier), and other officers and men from Esk, Harrier, and HMS Curacoa, HMS Eclipse, and HMS Miranda.

The memorial was designed by Frederick Sang, who was commissioned by a memorial fund headed by Rear Admiral Sir William Wiseman, 8th Baronet, former commodore of the Australia Station.  The obelisk was made by Charles Raymond Smith.

See also
 List of public art in Greenwich

References
 Monument to officers and men who fell in New Zealand campaign 1863–64, National Heritage List for England, Historic England
 Obelisk: New Zealand obelisk, londonremembers.com
 Royal Navy New Zealand War 1863–1864, Imperial War Museum
 Maritime Memorials, National Maritime Museum Greenwich
 Royal Navy New Zealand War 1863–1864, War Memorials Online

Buildings and structures in the Royal Borough of Greenwich
Military memorials in London
New Zealand Wars
Grade II listed buildings in the Royal Borough of Greenwich
Grade II listed monuments and memorials
New Zealand–United Kingdom military relations